The 2019 Asian Acrobatic Gymnastics Championships were the 11th edition of the Asian Acrobatic Gymnastics Championships, and were held in Tashkent, Uzbekistan from October 10 to 12, 2019.

Medal summary

Senior

Age group (12–18)

Medal table

References

A
Asian Gymnastics Championships
International gymnastics competitions hosted by Uzbekistan
2019 in Uzbekistani sport